Taisto Laitinen (born 17 September 1933) is a Finnish athlete. He competed in the men's pole vault at the 1964 Summer Olympics.

References

1933 births
Living people
Athletes (track and field) at the 1964 Summer Olympics
Finnish male pole vaulters
Olympic athletes of Finland
Place of birth missing (living people)